David Odikadze (born 14 April 1981) is a Georgian football player who plays as a right-sided defender for Shevardeni Tbilisi in the Erovnuli Liga 2, the second tier of Georgian football. Also playing as right midfielder.

Career 
He left on 6 February 2009 after four and a half-year Dinamo Tbilisi FC and joined to Győri ETO FC.

International 
Davit played for Georgia, he has his first game in 2005 passed, than was three years here inactive in 2008 was recalled to the national team, his comeback game was on 27 May 2008.

References

External links 
Profile on Inter Baku's Official Site

Laola.ge Stats 

1981 births
Living people
Footballers from Tbilisi
Footballers from Georgia (country)
Expatriate footballers from Georgia (country)
Georgia (country) international footballers
FC Samtredia players
FC Guria Lanchkhuti players
FC Kolkheti-1913 Poti players
FC Tbilisi players
FC Dinamo Tbilisi players
Győri ETO FC players
Expatriate footballers in Hungary
Shamakhi FK players
Expatriate footballers in Azerbaijan
FC Chikhura Sachkhere players
Association football defenders
FC Torpedo Kutaisi players
FC Shevardeni-1906 Tbilisi players
Expatriate sportspeople from Georgia (country) in Azerbaijan